David Galer Kirkpatrick is a Professor Emeritus of computer science at the University of British Columbia.  He is known for the Kirkpatrick–Seidel algorithm and his work on polygon triangulation, and for co-inventing α-shapes and the β-skeleton. He received his PhD from the University of Toronto in 1974.

Works 
 Dissertation: Topics in the Complexity of Combinatorial Algorithms, University of Toronto 1974

References

Year of birth missing (living people)
Living people
Researchers in geometric algorithms
Academic staff of the University of British Columbia
Canadian computer scientists
University of Toronto alumni
Fellows of the Royal Society of Canada